Joas Electronics is an electronics company headquartered in Seoul and Namyangju Gyeonggi-do, Korea. It was established in 1982 under the name SungJin Electronics but the name was changed in 1999 to Joas Electronics. It manufactures many electronic beauty products.

Products
Home appliances: Diamond peeling appliance, hair iron, hair dryer, electric hair clipper, electric shaver, battery shaver, as well as pet appliances.

See also
Economy of South Korea
List of South Korean companies

External links
Joas Electronics Homepage
Company and products information

Electronics companies established in 1982
Home appliance manufacturers of South Korea
Manufacturing companies based in Seoul
South Korean brands
South Korean companies established in 1982
Razor brands